Sincerity is the virtue of one who communicates and acts in accordance with their feelings, beliefs, thoughts and desires.

Sincere may also refer to:

People
Jean Sincere (1919–2013), American film, television, theater and voice actress
Lamont Sincere, American singer, songwriter and record producer 
Salvatore Sincere, American professional wrestler
Seth Sincere, Nigerian footballer

Music
Sincere (album), a 2000 album by MJ Cole
"Sincere" (song), its title track, released in 1998
"Are You Sincere", a 1957 song by Andy Williams, later recorded by Elvis Presley

Other uses
Sincere Department Store, a Hong Kong department store
Sincere voting, casting a vote for an outcome that the voter prefers above all others